Kendriya Vidyalaya No. 1, Jalandhar Cantonment, known as KV-1, JRC is a government school in Jalandhar Cantonment, Punjab, India. It was founded on 1 July 1963. The school is divided into primary and secondary sections. As of 2013, it has an enrollment of 1459 students.

Sports facilities 	
  Basketball ground
  Lawn Tennis ground
  Hockey ground
  Volleyball ground
  400 metres cinder with six lanes
  2 Badminton courts
  Football ground
 Table tennis tables

See also
 List of Kendriya Vidyalayas

References

External links 
 

Schools in Punjab, India
Kendriya Vidyalayas
1963 establishments in East Punjab
Educational institutions established in 1963
Education in Jalandhar